Vilcina was a Hungarian prelate in the 12th century, who served as Bishop of Transylvania around the years from 1166 to 1169, during the reign of Stephen III of Hungary.

Vilcina or Wulcina was elected bishop sometime after 1157 (or 1158), when his last known predecessor Walter is mentioned in this capacity. Vilcina first appears as bishop of Transylvania in October 1166, when he was among the witnesses in a royal charter of Stephen III, who confirmed a land transaction between a certain Vitus and the Knights Templar. Vilcina also acted as a witness in 1169, when Stephen III confirmed the privileges of the burghers of Šibenik. Vilcina held the position of bishop until 1181 at the latest, when Paul is mentioned in this capacity.

Notes

Sources

 
 

|-

|-

12th-century Roman Catholic bishops in Hungary
12th-century Hungarian people
Bishops of Transylvania